Phytoecia farinosa is a species of beetle in the family Cerambycidae. It was described by Ganglbauer in 1885. It is known from Turkmenistan and Iran.

References

Phytoecia
Beetles described in 1885